The Kuznetsov NK-88 was an experimental alternative fuel turbofan engine, designed by the Kuznetsov Design Bureau.

Development 
Development of the NK-88 began in 1974 at the Kuznetsov Design Bureau. It was a modification of the NK-8-2U two-spool low-bypass turbofan and was designed to run on liquid hydrogen (LH2). A further development of this engine, the NK-89, was designed to run on both liquified natural gas (LNG) and kerosine. 

On April 15, 1988, one NK-88 running on cryogenically stored LH2 was tested in flight in the starboard nacelle of the Tupolev Tu-155 flying laboratory. The other two nacelles contained engines of the native NK-8-2 type and ran on kerosene.

Applications 
 Tupolev Tu-155 (testbed)

Specifications (NK-88)

See also

References 

Low-bypass turbofan engines
1980s turbofan engines
Kuznetsov aircraft engines